Margaretta (or Margaret) Alexandra Eagar (12 August 1863 — 8 August 1936), was an Irishwoman who served as a nanny to the four daughters of Emperor and Empress Nicholas II and Alexandra Feodorovna of Russia, the Grand Duchesses Olga; Tatiana; Maria; and Anastasia—known collectively as OTMA—from 1898 to 1904.

In 1906, she wrote a memoir entitled Six Years at the Russian Court about her time with the family.

Early life
Eagar was born in Limerick, Ireland on 12 August 1863. She was one of ten children born to a Protestant couple, Francis McGillycuddy Eagar and Frances Margaret Holden. She was trained as a medical nurse in Belfast and worked at one point as matron of an orphanage.

Time at Court
Eagar was appointed nurse to the daughters of Nicholas II in 1898 and remained with them until 1904. Grand Duchess Olga Alexandrovna, an aunt of the girls later recalled Eagar's great love of politics. As a toddler, Maria once escaped from her bath and ran naked up and down the palace corridor while Eagar discussed the Dreyfus Affair with a friend. "Fortunately, I arrived just at that moment, picked her up and carried her back to Miss Eagar, who was still talking about Dreyfus," recalled the Grand Duchess.

The four grand duchesses began learning English from Eagar and, by 1904—by which time Eagar had left the Imperial Court—had developed a slight Hiberno-English accent in their pronunciation. In 1908 English tutor Charles Sydney Gibbes was brought in to "correct" this.

Eagar, who grew fond of all four grand duchesses, wrote in her book that she left the Russian Court for personal reasons. However, it was possible that she was dismissed due to the tense political situation surrounding the Russo-Japanese War, as Great Britain largely sided with Japan.

Later life
Eagar received a pension from the Russian government for her time as a nurse. She exchanged letters with the grand duchesses describing her work as a governess for other families up until their murder in July 1918. Family members stated that she remained haunted by the brutal murder of the family for the rest of her life. In later years, she ran a boarding house. She died in a nursing home in 1936, at the age of 72.

See also
Sydney Gibbes
Pierre Gilliard

References

Sources
Massie, Robert K., Nicholas and Alexandra, 1967, Dell Publishing Co., 
Zeepvat, Charlotte, From Cradle to Crown: British Nannies and Governesses at the World's Royal Courts, Sutton Publishing, ASIN B000GREBC0

External links
Eagar, Margaretta, Six Years at the Russian Court, 1906 
Alexander Palace Diaries
"Who was Margaretta Eagar"

1863 births
1936 deaths
Irish governesses
Irish memoirists
People from County Limerick
Irish domestic workers
Irish women memoirists
20th-century Irish educators
20th-century Irish writers
Governesses to the Imperial Russian court
20th-century Irish women writers
Irish expatriates in Russia
20th-century women educators
Court of Nicholas II of Russia